Kop Nück, also called Am Kopnück, is a small settlement, which belongs to the town of Bad Münstereifel in the district of Euskirchen in the German state of North Rhine-Westphalia.

Location 
Kop Nück lies 1.3 km south-southwest of Mahlberg and 2 km (both as the crow flies) southeast of Schönau, which are also part of Bad Münstereifel's borough. It is surrounded by the Schönau Forest (Schönauer Wald) and the hill of Kopnück (514.4 m) to the west. To the south is the state border with Rhineland-Palatinate.

References

External links 
 Home page of Bad Münstereifel

Euskirchen (district)